Maroš Klimpl (born 4 July 1980) is a Slovak football midfielder who plays with FK Kolín.

Club career 
Born in Martin, Slovakia, back then still part of Czechoslovakia, Klimpl played with Dukla Banská Bystrica and MFK Ružomberok for 6 seasons in the Slovak top tier before moving to the Czech Republic during the winter break of the 2001–02 season to join FK Viktoria Žižkov.  The first two seasons with Viktoria were successful as they finished third in the Czech championship, however in the 2003–04 season they finished 15th and Klimpl moved to FC Baník Ostrava who had just been Czech champions in that season. He stayed in Ostrava three years and, although Baník failed to conquer the Czech championship in those years, they did win the Czech Cup in the first season Klimpl was with them.

In summer 2007, as an already established Slovak international, he left Czech Republic after six consecutive seasons in the Gambrinus liga, and joined Danish side FC Midtjylland. At the end of the 2007–08 season they finished runners-up in the Danish Superliga however Klimpl was loaned to Scottish Premier League side Motherwell F.C. for the next season. He adapted well in Scotland and in July 2009, he joined Football League Championship side Cardiff City on trial. On 31 August 2009, he agreed a deal to join Scottish First Division side Dundee. On 4 May 2010, he was informed along with 3 other players that he was no longer wanted and was free to look for another club. On 28 June 2010, it was announced that he has been released from his contract. He subsequently rejoined Viktoria Žižkov for the 2010/2011 season. In February 2011 after a successful trial Klimpl signed with Serbian club Sloboda Užice.

In summer 2011 he moved to Cyprus joining Aris Limassol. Next summer he returned to the Czech Republic and for a season and a half played with third level side FC Chomutov. During the 2013–14 season winter break he moved to Gambrinus liga side FK Teplice. In summer 2014 he joined FK Kolín.

International 
He was member of the Slovak national football team between 2002 and 2007 and holds nineteen games and one goal.

Honours 
Banik Ostrava
Czech Cup: 2005

Dundee FC
Scottish Challenge Cup: 2009–10

References

External links
 Motherwell stats at SkySports.
 
 Slovakia – International Players at RSSSF.
 Maroš Klimpl at iDNES.cz 
 Landsholdsspiller til FC Midtjylland 
 
 Maroš Klimpl Stats at Utakmica.rs

1980 births
Living people
Sportspeople from Martin, Slovakia
Slovak footballers
Association football defenders
Slovakia international footballers
MFK Ružomberok players
FK Dukla Banská Bystrica players
Slovak Super Liga players
Slovak expatriate footballers
FK Viktoria Žižkov players
FC Baník Ostrava players
FK Teplice players
Czech First League players
Expatriate footballers in the Czech Republic
Slovak expatriate sportspeople in the Czech Republic
FC Midtjylland players
Danish Superliga players
Expatriate men's footballers in Denmark
Slovak expatriate sportspeople in Denmark
Motherwell F.C. players
Dundee F.C. players
Scottish Premier League players
Expatriate footballers in Scotland
Slovak expatriate sportspeople in Scotland
FK Sloboda Užice players
Aris Limassol FC players
Serbian SuperLiga players
Expatriate footballers in Serbia
Expatriate footballers in Cyprus
Scottish Football League players
Cypriot First Division players